Bradford, Iowa may refer to the following places in Iowa:
Bradford, Chickasaw County, Iowa, an unincorporated community
Bradford, Franklin County, Iowa, a census-designated place